The Red River Rugby Collegiate Conference is a college rugby conference in Division 1-A Rugby, formed during summer 2014. The conferences consists of many of the same schools from the Big 12 Conference that had previously been in the Allied Rugby Conference adding the Texas Christian University rugby team.

The "Allied Rugby Conference" (ARC) was an annual rugby union competition played among universities in the South Central United States.  ARC featured a spring 15s competition and a fall 7s competition. The ARC folded in the summer of 2014.

Member schools

Notes:
 Texas left the ARC during the summer of 2013 to play its regular season in the SouthWest Athletic Conference and its post season in the Varsity Cup. Texas is now a full member of the Red River Conference.
 Sam Houston State was a member of the ARC but is not a member of the Red River Conference.

Founding and early success
The formation of the Allied Rugby Conference was announced in May 2012.
The Allied Rugby Conference was formed with three schools from the D1-AA Southwest Conference (Texas, Baylor, Sam Houston State), two schools from the D1-A Mid-South Conference (Oklahoma, Texas A&M), and one school from D2 (Texas Tech).

The formation of this new conference was part of the trend in college rugby of regrouping into traditional conferences to take advantage of existing brands and rivalries.  Another goal behind forming the ARC was to assist clubs to reach their maximum potential and raise the standard of rugby throughout the region. The conference also formed to establish a core group of name-recognizable institutions to market for sponsorship & recruitment on the collective college campuses.

Before the Conference had even begun play, they had already secured sponsorship from the World Rugby Shop, and the Allied conference also secured a sponsorship with Gilbert. The ARC was formed to get the teams significant exposure from a marketing and brand perspective. Games are podcast and in some instances live web cast. The ARC webcasts a conference "game of the week" each Monday during the spring 2012 competition.

Leadership
TeShay Flowers is the Conference Commissioner.

Competitions
The ARC announced a desire to pursue a bowl game type of event, which would involve playing matches against teams from neighboring conferences.

Regular season

Notes:
 Gold shading indicates qualified for the ARC championship.

Playoffs

Sevens
The Allied Rugby Conference 7s is played every fall, and includes all conference teams plus select non-conference invited opponents. The winner lands an automatic place in the USA Rugby Sevens Collegiate National Championships. The ARC also announced it aims to gain an automatic qualifier to the Collegiate Rugby Championship 7s event played every June in Philadelphia.

References

External links
 

 
2014 establishments in Louisiana
Rugby union in Texas
2014 establishments in Texas
2014 establishments in Oklahoma